Lake Arareco is a lake high in the Sierra Madre Occidental range, within Chihuahua state in northwestern Mexico.

The lake is U-shaped. It is surrounded by unusual rock formations, and a fragrant pine forest.

A few kilometres away a scenic canyon has the Cascada Cusárare waterfall, which drops .

See also
Sierra Madre Occidental pine-oak forests

Arareko
Landforms of Chihuahua (state)
Landforms of the Sierra Madre Occidental
Tourist attractions in Chihuahua (state)